The Angolan football Super Cup is a single-match competition in Angolan football, played between the Angolan league champion and the Angola Cup winner. In case the same team happens to win both the league and the cup, the match will be played between the league winner and the cup runner-up.

The Super Cup match marks the beginning of the football season, followed by the league and the cup.

Match details

Performance by club

Managers

Supertaça de Angola (women's)

See also
 Taça de Angola
 Girabola
 Women's League
 Supertaça de Angola (basketball)
 Supertaça de Angola (handball)
 Supertaça de Angola (roller hockey)

References

External links
RSSSF archive of results

 
SuperCup